Walter Escobar romero born 26 September 1968) is a Colombian retired footballer.

International career
He has made three appearances for the Colombia national football team, scoring one goal.

References

External links
 Profile - CD FAS 

1968 births
Living people
Colombian footballers
Colombia international footballers
Deportivo Cali footballers
Cortuluá footballers
Atlético Huila footballers
Deportivo Pereira footballers
Atlético Nacional footballers
Defensor Sporting players
Independiente Medellín footballers
Club Olimpia footballers
Deportivo Pasto footballers
C.D. FAS footballers
Atlético F.C. footballers
Categoría Primera A players
Expatriate footballers in Uruguay
Expatriate footballers in Paraguay
Expatriate footballers in El Salvador
Association football forwards
Sportspeople from Cauca Department